Tammy's Greatest Hits is a compilation album by American country music singer-songwriter Tammy Wynette. It was released on August 11, 1969, by Epic Records. The album was certified platinum in 1989 by the RIAA.

Track listing

References

1969 greatest hits albums
Tammy Wynette compilation albums